Hinduism is a recent phenomenon in Togo. The religion was introduced by indigenous Africans based in Accra, Ghana, and a branch of the Hindu Monastery of Africa has been established in Lomé. There are about 80,000 or 1% Hindus in Togo in 2022.

See also 
 Hinduism by country
 Hinduism in Ghana
 Hinduism in Nigeria

References 

Togo
Togo
Religion in Togo